Raíces is a 1955 Mexican drama film directed by Benito Alazraki. It was entered into the 1955 Cannes Film Festival.

Cast
 Beatriz Flores - Martina (segment "Las vacas")
 Juan de la Cruz - Esteban (segment "Las vacas")
 Juan Cano - Don Remigio (segment "Las vacas")
 Rafael Ramírez - The Cousin (segment "Las vacas")
 Conchita Montes - The City Woman (segment "Las vacas")
 Eduardo Urruchua - The City Man (segment "Las vacas")
 Olimpia Alazraki - Jane Davis (segment "Nuestra Señora")
 Doctor González - Himself (segment "Nuestra Señora")
 Juan Hernández - Mariano (segment "Nuestra Señora")
 Ángel Lara - The Priest (segment "Nuestra Señora")
 Miguel Ángel Negrón - The One-Eyed Kid (segment "El tuerto")
 Antonia Hernández - The Mother (segment "El Tuerto")
 Mario Herrera - The Mother's Friend (segment "El tuerto")
 Alicia del Lago - Xanath (segment "La potranca")
 Carlos Robles Gil - Eric (segment "La potranca")
 Teódalo González - Teódulo (segment "La potranca")
 Laura Holt - Vivian (segment "La potranca")
 Fernando Marcos - Narrator (prologue)

References

External links

1955 films
1950s Spanish-language films
1955 drama films
Mexican black-and-white films
Films directed by Benito Alazraki
Indigenous cinema in Latin America
Mexican drama films
1950s Mexican films